QNB Finansbank is a Turkish bank with headquarters in Levent, Istanbul. It was established by leading Turkish banker Hüsnü Özyeğin in 1987 and for a period was the Turkish bank with the largest network of foreign branches. In 2016 the QNB Group  headquartered in Doha, Qatar (the largest bank in the Middle East and Africa in that year), acquired Finansbank from the National Bank of Greece (NBG), which had purchased the bank's domestic operations back in 2006, spinning the international operations off under the name Credit Europe Bank.

As of September 30, 2015, the bank operated with 647 branches and 13,000 employees. In the third quarter of 2015, Finansbank's profit was 673 million TL; its total loans rose to 57 billion 194 million TL; total assets rose to 90 billion 410 million TL; customer deposit portfolio rose to 47 billion 306 million TL; and total equities reached 8 billion 937 million TL.

In late 2015, the National Bank of Greece announced its decision to sell Finansbank to Qatari QNB Group in a deal worth 2.7 billion Euros. On June 15, 2016, the acquisition of Finansbank by the QNB Group was completed.

History of purchases

On March 18, 2014, Turkish daily Hürriyet reported the purchase by National Bank of Greece (NBG) of Soyak Kristal Kule (Soyak Crystal Tower), a 40-floor, 60,000 square-meter office tower in Levent, one of the main business districts in Istanbul. The property was purchased for a reported price of $303M (US) from Koru Property Investments, a subsidiary of Soyak Group in Turkey. Hürriyet reported that NBG intended to use the newly constructed tower as Finansbank's headquarters. The property includes an adjoining 12-floor structure of 30,000 square-meters which is topped by a helipad. The main building's Turkish name, Kristal Kule (Crystal Tower) refers to the glass-sheathed structure's asymmetric, faceted, sloping silhouette. The project used a performance-based building design (PBBD). The principal architects were Pei Cobb Freed & Partners. The design, planning, engineering, and consulting firm, Arup, provided project management services for the project.

On December 22, 2015, the National Bank of Greece (NBG) announced it will sell the bank to Qatari QNB Group including €910m of subordinate debt for a sum of €2.75bn in cash. The transaction would give the Greek bank a liquidity boost of €3.4bn, which it would use to pay down its expensive debt to the Greek Central Bank following a number of bailouts of Greek sovereign debt backed by the ECB and IMF. The acquisition of Finansbank by the QNB Group was completed on June 15, 2016.

Subsidiaries
 Finans Emeklilik
 Finans Faktoring
 Finans Invest
 Finans Leasing
 Finans Portföy
 Finans Tüketici Finansmanı
 IBTech
 eFinans

Banking Services
 Consumer Banking
 SME Banking
 Corporate Banking
 Private Banking

References

External links

Sources 
 

Banks of Turkey
Banks established in 1987
2016 mergers and acquisitions